The Don River is a river located in Central Queensland, Australia.

Located within the Fitzroy River basin, the Don River rises in the Don River State Forest below Black Mountain and flows generally west, then southwest, than west, joined by twelve tributaries. The Don River descends  over its  course. From source to mouth, the river is crossed by the Burnett Highway and the Leichhardt Highway.

See also

References

Rivers of Queensland
Central Queensland